Goose Creek Township, population 14,773, is one of nine townships in Union County, North Carolina. This township includes a small part of the City of Monroe, plus parts of the Towns of Fairview (entirely), Indian Trail, Stallings, and Unionville.

Geography
The northeast boundary of the township is defined by the Rocky River and most of the township is drained by the Rocky River's tributaries.  These include Clear Creek, Crooked Creek, Goose Creek, and Grassy Creek. 
The south side of the township is drained by tributaries to Ricardson Creek and include Chinkapin Creek, Mill Creek, Stumplick Creek, and Watson Creek.

References

Townships in Union County, North Carolina
Townships in North Carolina